Mustafa Üstündağ may refer to:

 Mustafa Üstündağ (politician)
 Mustafa Üstündağ (actor)